Transbordeur is a peer-reviewed academic journal devoted to the history of photography. Published in French by Éditions Macula, its aim is an appraisal of the full extent and diversity of photography’s impact on history and society. Transbordeur includes work in the fields of history of photography, art, media, architecture and social science.

Editors-in-chief are Christian Joschke (Paris Nanterre University) and Olivier Lugon (University of Lausanne).

Editors-in-chief
 Christian Joschke: 2017 – present
 Olivier Lugon: 2017 – present

References

External links 
Official website

Media studies journals
Multidisciplinary humanities journals
Annual journals
French-language journals